Matthew Choate (born May 6, 1971) was a legislator in the Vermont Senate. He was elected in 2008. He was one of two senators in the Caledonia Vermont Senate District, 2002–2012. He resides in St. Johnsbury, Vermont. He is a Democrat.

Biography
Choate was born in St. Johnsbury, Vermont May 6, 1971. He was the eldest son of Jonathan and Wanda Rexford Choate.

He graduated from the University of Vermont with a Bachelor of Science in biochemistry in 1992 and a bachelor of science in nursing in 1997. He was a nurse manager, Dartmouth Hitchcock Medical Center, Emergency Clinical Coordinator, Central Vermont Hospital Center. He was a nurse at the Vermont Poison Center, Fletcher Allen Health Care.
He currently manages the pediatric ICU at Dartmouth Hitchcock.

See also
Members of the Vermont Senate, 2009-2010 session

Footnotes

External links
Vermont Senate Biographies

Vermont state senators
1942 births
Living people
University of Vermont alumni
People from St. Johnsbury, Vermont